George Cassedy (September 16, 1783 – December 31, 1842) was a U.S. Representative from New Jersey.

Born in Hackensack, New Jersey, Cassedy attended the common schools, where he studied law.
He was admitted to the bar in 1809 and commenced practice in Hackensack, and became the postmaster of Hackensack from June 10, 1805, to January 1, 1806. He owned slaves.

Cassedy was elected as a Democratic-Republican to the Seventeenth Congress, reelected as a Jacksonian Democratic-Republican to the Eighteenth Congress, and reelected as a Jacksonian to the Nineteenth Congress (March 4, 1821 – March 3, 1827).
He died in Hackensack, December 31, 1842, and was interred there in the First Reformed Dutch Church Cemetery.

References

External links

George Cassedy at The Political Graveyard

1783 births
1842 deaths
Politicians from Hackensack, New Jersey
Democratic-Republican Party members of the United States House of Representatives from New Jersey
Jacksonian members of the United States House of Representatives from New Jersey
New Jersey lawyers
American slave owners
Burials at First Reformed Dutch Church, Hackensack